Gangari Brahmin also spelled Gangadi is a Garhwali Brahmin subcaste from Uttarakhand, India. Gangari Brahmins were the authenticated Brahmin castes in the then small Garhwal Kingdom. The capital of this kingdom was Chandpur Garhi and several castes of Brahmins were settled in the villages surrounding the Ganges valley. Brahmins living in these villages were known as "Gangari" Brahmins. Later the relatives of these Brahmins who joined them in Garhwal were also known as "Gangari Brahmins".

Surnames
 Kukreti
 Dangwal
 Devrani
 Bahuguna
 Dangwal 
 Dobhal 
 Uniyal 
 Ghidliyal 
 Naithani 
 Dashmana 
 Juyal 
 Barthwal 
 Mamgai
 Dabral 
 Joshi 
 Raturi
Etc

See also
 Sarola Brahmin

References 

Brahmin communities of Uttarakhand
Garhwal division